Brode is a settlement in the Municipality of Vransko in central Slovenia. The area is part of the traditional region of Styria. The municipality is now included in the Savinja Statistical Region. The settlement includes the hamlets of Gaberšek and Tržica (or Tršca).

Name
The name of the settlement was changed from Tržca to Brode in 1955. Until 1955, the name Brode referred to a hamlet of Tržca.

References

External links

Brode at Geopedia

Populated places in the Municipality of Vransko